Floyd James Wheeler (born November 8, 1953) is an American businessman and politician from the state of Nevada. A member of the Republican Party, Wheeler served in the Nevada Assembly, representing the 39th district.

Early career 
Wheeler was the chief executive officer of Powerdyne Automotive Products.

Nevada assembly

Assemblyman 
Wheeler first ran for the Nevada Assembly in 2010, seeking to replace James Settelmeyer, who was not running for reelection. However, Kelly Kite won the election.

Wheeler was first elected in 2012, defeating Kelly Kite.

Tenure 
Assembly Bill 86 was a bill that would have reduced the minimum age to gamble from 21 to 18. Wheeler supported the bill. However, the bill died in the senate.

Minority leader (2017 - 2019) 
Wheeler served as a minority leader from 2017 until his resignation in 2019. He was replaced by assemblywoman Robin L. Titus. Wheeler won re-election back to the 39th district.

Criticism 
Wheeler told constituents that he would vote to reinstitute slavery if his constituents wanted him to. An ethics complaint was filed against Wheeler, stating that he does not live in the 39th district. Another complaint was filed against Wheeler for failing to disclose a lien.

References

External links

 

1953 births
21st-century American politicians
Living people
Republican Party members of the Nevada Assembly
Politicians from Los Angeles